HMS Janus was the lead ship of the s which served with the Royal Navy.  She was launched by Palmers in 1895, served on the Chinese station for much of her career and was sold off in 1912.

Service history
She served on that station for most of her career.

She underwent repairs to re-tube her Reed boilers in 1902.

Notes

Bibliography

 

Janus-class destroyers